The Swiftsure class battleships of the late Victorian era were broadside ironclads designed and built specifically for service as Flagships on the Pacific station.

Design  
The intention was to make the ships good performers under sail, while at the same time being stable ships and good gun platforms.

At the design stage it had been suggested by the Committee on Designs that the ships should be built with their artillery mounted in two turrets, with some smaller guns positioned fore and aft. As there was at that time not sufficient experience with turret-mounted armament, and none at all with turrets in first-class battleships, the idea did not find favour and this class was completed with a broadside box battery deployed on two levels, on the main and on the upper deck.

Fouling of ships' hulls by marine life had been a problem since the dawn of shipbuilding. Until the middle of the nineteenth century ships' bottoms had been sheathed with copper sheeting, which prevented fouling but was expensive. Sheathing with zinc plate or with Muntz metal was used thereafter, as it was cheaper. For the Swiftsure class, however, a reversion was made to copper sheathing, as in the Pacific there were no docking facilities whatsoever - until the completion of the dockyard at Esquimalt in 1886 - and the sheathing applied on commissioning had to serve for the whole commission.

All ranks were berthed on the main deck; berthing for seamen in previous classes had been on the lower deck. As the officers' accommodation was well ventilated and well lit, the ships were universally popular.

History 

The two ships spent some time in reserve, but in their active careers they took turns as flagship of the Pacific station.

References

External links

Ironclad classes
Ship classes of the Royal Navy